Jokeri light rail is an under-construction light rail line which began construction in June 2019, which will serve the Finnish cities of Helsinki and Espoo. The  line will replace the current bus line 550, the busiest bus service on the Helsinki Regional Transport Authority public transport network.

Background
The "core bus line" 550, formerly branded Jokeri ("The Joker", after Joukkoliikenteen kehämäinen raideinvestointi – "A circular rail investment for public transportation"), will be converted to light rail. The city councils of Helsinki and Espoo approved the construction project in June 2016, after the state of Finland decided to participate in funding the construction. The rail line was preliminarily projected to open in 2021. The construction of the  light rail line, without rolling stock or a depot, is projected to cost 274 million euros as of June 2016, with rolling stock and a depot projected to additionally cost up to 95 and 65 million euros. 

The 550 was originally conceived as a light rail line in 1990, but only realised as a bus line in 2003. The general plans to convert the congested bus line to light rail were first published in 2009, but the decision to begin construction was only taken in June 2016 after many delays. The municipality of Espoo is planning the western terminus of the rail line at Keilaniemi instead of Tapiola. There will be a connection to the Metro at Aalto University and Keilaniemi.

The current 550 is a  orbital bus line that runs roughly parallel to the innermost ring road around Helsinki (Ring I). The 550 runs from Itäkeskus in the East to Tapiola in the West, connecting with the commuter rail network at Oulunkylä, Huopalahti, Pitäjänmäki and Leppävaara, and with the Metro in Itäkeskus and Tapiola.

The 550 light rail line will be a very significant development for the Helsinki tram network. The route is located entirely outside the current network, surrounding it; the length of the route will be a large proportion of the total network, and the line is being planned to modern light rail standards (as opposed to the relatively old-fashioned street tram system). However, the new line will be technically compatible with the existing network (low platforms, 600 V DC electrification). Direct integration with the Helsinki Metro (broad gauge, high platforms, planned driverless operation) was briefly studied in 2003, but it was found to be highly impractical.

Construction
Construction on the line officially began on 6 June 2019.

See also
 
 Trams in Finland
Helsinki tram network
 Planned extension of the Helsinki tram network

References

External links

Transport in Helsinki
Tram transport in Finland
Proposed railway lines in Finland
Tram and light rail transit systems under construction
Light rail in Finland
2024 in rail transport